The Shaw River is an ephemeral river in the Pilbara region of Western Australia. It was named by explorer F.T. Gregory on 21 August 1861 after Norton Shaw, Secretary of the Royal Geographical Society.

The river is braided and has many islands in the riverbed including Long Island and Rocky Island. The river continues through Gorge Range and flows north until discharging into the De Grey River, of which it is a tributary, just south of the North West Coastal Highway approximately  East of Port Hedland.

The river has 23 tributaries including Big Creek, Tambourah Creek, Coolargarrak Creek, Dalton Creek and Miralga Creek. It also flows through one major pool; Coondina Pool.

During drought conditions the river can have zero flow for up to 4 years at a time.

The water quality of the river is dependent on flow but has an average salinity of 110 mg/L and a turbidity of 78 NTU.

References

Rivers of the Pilbara region